Horatio Stockton Howell (August 14, 1820 – July 1, 1863) was a Union Army chaplain killed in downtown Gettysburg on the first day of the Battle of Gettysburg in the American Civil War.

Early life
Howell was born near Trenton, New Jersey, a son of William and Abigail Howell, the fifth of seven children.

Education
He graduated from Lafayette College and Union Theological Seminary in New York City. He was ordained in 1846. His first charge was the Presbyterian Church of East Whiteland, Pennsylvania. He married Isabella Grant in 1846.

Career as minister and teacher
In 1853 he was called on to serve the Presbyterian Church in the small hamlet of Delaware Water Gap in northeastern Pennsylvania. There he also ran a private school for boys.

Abolitionist
During the antebellum era, he developed into a devout Unionist and a staunch abolitionist. He experienced what he called the "wickedness" of slavery first-hand while stationed in Elkton, Maryland, convincing him that the institution "would reduce to the condition of brutes those whom God had created in his own image and for whom Christ had died." He was also influenced by the fiery anti-secession sermons of his mentor, the Reverend James Wilson.

Military career
Upon the counsel of his mentor, Howell enlisted as the regimental chaplain of the 90th Pennsylvania Infantry on March 13, 1862, in Philadelphia.

Battle of Gettysburg
On the first day of the Battle of Gettysburg, July 1, 1863, Confederate forces engaged Union troops to the west of town, near the Lutheran Theological Seminary. Medical personnel of the I Corps selected the College Lutheran Church at #44 Chambersburg Street as a divisional field hospital. (The building is now called Christ Lutheran Church.) A civilian resident of Gettysburg  recalled that 140 men were laid in the sanctuary around midday, beds being improvised by laying boards on top of the pews. Limbs were being amputated and thrown out of the church windows, piling up on the ground below.

Late in the afternoon, the Confederates began to push the Union troops back through town. Shortly after 4 o'clock, the overwhelmed First Corps soldiers fell back through the streets of Gettysburg to the heights on Cemetery Ridge and Cemetery Hill south of town. A chaotic scene ensued as jubilant Confederates followed closely on their heels. As the Union retreat swept toward the College Lutheran Church, Chaplain Howell was assisting members of the medical staff inside the building. After hearing shots outside, Howell turned to a nearby surgeon and said, "I will step outside for a moment and see what the trouble is."

Sgt. Archibald Snow followed Howell out of the church door. Later, Snow wrote the most detailed account of what happened:

Howell died at age 42. Following the battle, his remains were shipped to Brooklyn, New York and laid to rest in Green-Wood Cemetery.  A monument at the foot of the College Lutheran church steps was dedicated in 1889 to mark the spot where the chaplain was killed.

References

People of New Jersey in the American Civil War
Union Army chaplains
American abolitionists
Presbyterian Church in the United States of America ministers
Burials at Green-Wood Cemetery
1820 births
1863 deaths
19th-century Presbyterian ministers
Presbyterian abolitionists
19th-century American clergy
Union military personnel killed in the American Civil War